Dmytro Heorhiyovych Horbatenko (born 17 May 1973) is a Ukrainian football coach and a former player. He managed FC Zhemchuzhyna Odessa.

Honours
Chornomorets Odessa
Ukrainian Cup winner: 1992

References

1973 births
Living people
Soviet footballers
Ukrainian footballers
FC Chornomorets Odesa players
FC Krystal Kherson players
FC Vorskla Poltava players
FC KAMAZ Naberezhnye Chelny players
Ukrainian expatriate footballers
Expatriate footballers in Russia
Russian Premier League players
FC Volgar Astrakhan players
FC Zvezda Irkutsk players
MFC Mykolaiv players
FC Dnipro Cherkasy players
Ukrainian football managers
Association football midfielders
FC Zhemchuzhyna Odesa managers
FC Neftekhimik Nizhnekamsk players
FC Chita players